Guillaume Alzingre (born 21 December 1983) is a former French male canoeist who won 22 medals at senior level at the Wildwater Canoeing World Championships.

Medals at the World Championships
Of his 20 medals at the world championships, 9 were at individual level and 11 at team level.
Senior

References

External links
 

1983 births
Living people
French male canoeists
People from Senlis
Sportspeople from Oise
21st-century French people